Nuclear atypia refers to abnormal appearance of cell nuclei. It is a term used in cytopathology and histopathology. Atypical nuclei are often pleomorphic.

Nuclear atypia can be seen in reactive changes, pre-neoplastic changes and malignancy.  Severe nuclear atypia is, in most cases, considered an indicator of malignancy.

See also
Arias-Stella reaction
NC ratio
Nuclear pleomorphism

Pathology